Donna Brown (née Quinn) (born 12 October 1963) is a former Australian women's basketball player.

Biography

Brown played for the national team between 1982 and 1989, competing at the 1984 Olympic Games in Los Angeles and the 1988 Olympic Games in Seoul. Brown also represented Australia at one World Championship; 1986 held in the Soviet Union.

In the domestic Women's National Basketball League (WNBL) Brown played 215 games for both the Australian Institute of Sport (44 games) and the North Adelaide Rockets (171 games). Brown was also named to the WNBL All Star Five on two occasions; 1988 and 1990.

See also
 WNBL All-Star Five

References

1963 births
Living people
Australian women's basketball players
Olympic basketball players of Australia
Basketball players at the 1984 Summer Olympics
Basketball players at the 1988 Summer Olympics
Australian Institute of Sport basketball (WNBL) players